No Escape is a 1936 British thriller film directed by Norman Lee and starring Valerie Hobson, Leslie Perrins and Robert Cochran. The screenplay concerns a man who attempts to hide his friend for a month.

Plot summary
For a bet a man attempts to hide his friend for a month. The police soon believe he has murdered him.

Cast
 Valerie Hobson as Laura Anstey
 Leslie Perrins as Anthony Wild
 Robert Cochran as Beeston
 Henry Oscar as Cyril Anstey
 Billy Milton as Billy West
 Ronald Simpson as Scoop Martin
 Kenneth Law as Jenner
 Margaret Yarde as Bunty
 Hal Gordon as County Constable
 J. Neil More as Police Commissioner
 Hilda Campbell as Russell - Barmaid

Critical reception
TV Guide gave the film two out of four stars: "the story is a little slow to start but once things are under way, this turns into an effective, though minor thriller. The acting and production credits are adequate."

References

External links

1936 films
British mystery thriller films
1930s English-language films
Films directed by Norman Lee
British black-and-white films
1930s mystery thriller films
1930s British films